Nizar Touil (born 11 December 1989) is a Tunisian footballer who plays as a midfielder for Sajer.

References

External links
 

1989 births
Living people
Tunisian footballers
Tunisian expatriate footballers
CO Médenine players
Club Africain players
Olympique du Kef players
EO Sidi Bouzid players
Grombalia Sports players
US Ben Guerdane players
AS Gabès players
Olympique Béja players
Al-Sharq Club players
Tuwaiq Club players
SC Ben Arous players
Sajer Club players
Tunisian Ligue Professionnelle 1 players
Saudi Second Division players
Expatriate footballers in Saudi Arabia
Tunisian expatriate sportspeople in Saudi Arabia
Association football midfielders